Light the Horizon is the fourth LP by Canadian reggae / ska band Bedouin Soundclash. It was released on their own label, Pirates Blend, on September 28, 2010.

The song "Mountain Top" was the first single made available from the collection. The second single was "Elongo". On "Brutal Hearts", however, Malinowski had established a new duo with Coeur de pirate, called Armistice, who would release an EP in the next year.

Track listing 
All tracks written and composed by Bedouin Soundclash.

"Mountain Top" – 3:16
"Fools Tattoo" – 4:09
"May You Be the Road" – 3:04
"Brutal Hearts" (feat. Cœur de pirate) – 3:10
"Elongo" – 3:17
"No One Moves, No One Gets Hurt" – 2:41
"The Quick & The Dead" – 2:13
"Rolling Stone" – 3:22
"A Chance of Rain" – 4:14
"Follow the Sun" – 4:42
"Get It the Way You Want It" – 1:40 (iTunes Bonus Track)
"On My Block" – 3:47 (iTunes Pre-Order Only Bonus Track)

Singles
"Mountain Top"
"Elongo"
"A Chance of Rain"

Credits

Bedouin Soundclash
Jay Malinowski - vocals, guitar; lyrics 
Eon Sinclair - bass
Sekou Lumumba - drums

Engineer, mixer
Jeff Chestek

Mastering
Phil Demetro
Ted Jensen

References

2010 albums
Bedouin Soundclash albums